Ben Ratliff (born 1968 in New York City) is an American journalist, music critic and author.

Ratliff is the son of an English mother and an American father, growing up in London and in Rockland County, New York. 
From 1996 to 2016, he wrote about pop music and jazz for The New York Times. He is the author of four books: Every Song Ever: Twenty Ways to Listen in an Age of Musical Plenty (2016), The Jazz Ear: Conversations Over Music (2008), Jazz: A Critic's Guide to the 100 Most Important Recordings (2002), and a critical biography of John Coltrane (The Story of a Sound, 2007), which was a finalist for the National Book Critics Circle Award. His articles have appeared in The New York Review of Books , Granta, Rolling Stone, Spin, The Village Voice, Slate and Lingua Franca. In 2005, he received the Helen Dance-Robert Palmer Award for "Excellence in Newspaper, Magazine or Online Writing" from the Jazz Journalists Association. From 2012 to 2016, he was a regular host of The New York Times popcast.

He teaches cultural criticism at New York University's Gallatin School of Individualized Study. Ratliff earned a B.A. from Columbia University in 1990.

Publications 
 Every Song Ever: Twenty Ways to Listen in an Age of Musical Plenty. Farrar, Straus and Giroux, New York, 2016.
 The Jazz Ear: Conversations Over Music. Times Books, New York, 2008.
 Coltrane: The Story of a Sound. Farrar, Straus and Giroux, New York, 2007.
 The New York Times Essential Library: Jazz. Times Books, New York, 2002.

References

External links 
 Official website
 Profile for The New York Times
 Interview with Steven Ward, 2002
 Interview with Pitchfork about Every Song Ever, Feb 26, 2016
 Review of Every Song Ever by August Kleinzahler, New York Times Book Review, March 3, 2016
 Interview about music algorithms on "What's the Point" podcast, fivethirtyeight.com, April 21, 2016

1968 births
Living people
Jazz writers
Journalists from New York City
American music critics
Writers from New York City
Columbia College (New York) alumni